S. Krishna is an Indian cinematographer and film director, who primarily works in Kannada cinema. He gave a new dimension for cinematography through his breathtaking visuals in Mungaru Male. He's an alumnus of Government Film and Television Institute, Bangalore.

Career
 Though Krishna's cinematography impressed people and the critics, he didn't come into his own until he did the challenging Mungaaru Male. The film was shot in 80% natural rain, generally not cinematography friendly. It also needed to be shot in other precarious conditions – like the dangerous, rocky top of the Jog Falls. Krishna took up the challenge and did the job admirably. The film was a box office success and one of the major contributors to its success was Krishna's cinematography. He was duly recognized by the Karnataka State Government when they named him the Best Cinematographer for the year 2006. According to Yogaraj Bhat, the director of the film, the cinematographer was his partner-in-crime for all risky and foolhardy propositions. Krishna maintains that since he had complete freedom to do as he liked, he could deliver his best.

After Mungaaru Male, Krishna went on to do a film with debutant director Harsha.A. Geleya did not have much scope for experimentation cinematographically, but the film's most popular track (Ee Sanje Yaakaagide), which was shot in slow motion, was the highlight of the film. Krishna did Haage Summane next, for Preetam Gubbi, one of the main collaborators in the film Mungaaru Male. Since then, he's the most frequent collaborator for all of Preetam Gubbi's films.

He also served as cinematographer for the film Raaj the Showman, directed by Prem and starring Puneeth Rajkumar and Priyanka Kothari. Though the critics were not impressed with the film, Krishna's work was applauded by all. He then worked for Kempegowda, Kannada remake of Tamil Blockbuster Singham, which starred Sudeep in the lead and also directed by himself. Krishna had collaborated with Sudeep for the second time, after Ranga SSLC which starred Sudeep in the lead. The movie showed the hidden talented side of Krishna, who had experimented a lot in the movie and took the technicalities to another level. 'Supergoodmovies' praised his work as "the camerawork stands out in the technical department. Krishna, who is otherwise known for wielding a camera for mushy love stories, does a very good job in this action film. For a change, fights using safety cords look real. Krishna also shows his ability also in song sequences".

Krishna was supposed to work with Yograj Bhat for Lagori starring Puneeth Rajkumar but the project was dropped. In 2012, they collaborated for the film Drama starring Yash and Radhika Pandit. Naturally, the whole film industry's eyes were on him expecting to recreate the magic of Mungaru Male along with Yogaraj Bhat.

Drama was released in November to the most positive reviews from critics and audiences alike. The movie was a blockbuster of 2012 and it garnered rave reviews for Krishna for his work from all over the country. IBN Live praised his work as "The film's highlight is the remarkable camerawork of S Krishna, who is arguably one of the country's top directors of photography. Indiaglitz quoted his work as "S Krishna in his comeback after 'Mungaru Male' in the direction of Yogaraj Bhat has no flaws."

He then collaborated with Duniya Soori for Kaddipudi starring Shivrajkumar and Radhika Pandit.

Gajakesari and afterwards
When he was at the peak of his career as a cinematographer he challenged himself to be a director. He directed Gajakesari starring Yash which broke all of the previous records of Yash thereby catapulting him as the next big star in the Kannada film industry. Gajakesari even won Karnataka State Film Award for Best Entertaining Film of the year 2014.

After this, Gajakesari Krishna took a break to work on his next project titled Hebbuli. Many big names of the industry were considered for the project like Darshan, Sudeep, Puneeth Rajkumar, Yash, etc. Sudeep liked the script so much that he gave his consent to work in the project.
Hebbuli brings back the successful duo of Maanikya, Ravichandran, and Sudeep. Therefore, the expectations were riding very high on Hebbuli. The principal photography of the film is expected to start in April after Sudeep completes his shoot for K.S.Ravikumar's next.

Krishna recently wrapped up his portions of the shoot as a cinematographer for Dwarakish's 50th production named Chowka. He's one of the 5 cinematographers for the film which is being directed by debutant Tharun Sudhir, brother of famous director Nanda Kishore.

Hebbuli was released on 23 February 2017. It had the best opening in Sudeep's career. Impressed with Krishan's talents Sudeep agreed to do one more project with the director. The project was named as Pailwaan. It was produced by the director himself under his home production house RRR Motion Pictures. Pailwaan was released in multiple languages, in Kannada, Hindi, Tamil, Telugu, and Malayalam. It had the biggest release in Sudeep's career. But the collections were hugely affected due to piracy. It was declared a super hit.

Now after the massive success of Pailwaan, Krishna is gearing up for his next. The project is unnamed as of now and has been delayed due to COVID-19 pandemic.

Personal life
Krishna is married to a well known Kannada television actress Swapna. He currently resides with his wife and three children in Bangalore.

Filmography

As director

As cinematographer

Television
Produced 4 Serials under RRR Creations

Awards
 Karnataka State Government Award for Best Cinematographer in 2006 (Mungaru Male)
 Filmfare Best Cinematographer Award for Haage Summane in 2008
 South Scope Award in 2009

References

External links
 Geleya – E sanje yaakaagide video song https://www.youtube.com/watch?v=-1TEJkzEgYc
 Lucky – Hoovina video song https://www.youtube.com/watch?v=fyv1r9Pki68
  Rendezvous with S Krishna
  'Mungaru Male' is perfect answer – S. Krishna
  'Drama' Review: This Kannada film is an entertaining drama
 https://twitter.com/krisshdop

1975 births
Living people
Kannada film cinematographers
Kannada film directors
Filmfare Awards South winners
Film directors from Bangalore
21st-century Indian film directors
Cinematographers from Karnataka